Volumes 7 & 8 is a compilation of the seventh and eighth releases from The Desert Sessions. The seventh volume is titled Gypsy Marches, and the eighth Can You See Under My Thumb? There You Are.. The album features appearances from Mark Lanegan, Alain Johannes, Natasha Shneider, Chris Goss, Brendon McNichol, Fred Drake, Nick Eldorado, and Joshua Homme.

Track listing

Notes
Queens of the Stone Age re-recorded "Hanging Tree" for their 2002 album Songs for the Deaf.
The track "Interpretive Reading" is a mostly verbatim excerpt of the children's book A Ghost Named Fred. The reading is set to a background of musical improvisation and a chorus from Indio High School singing their school's alma mater song.
The main riff in the track "Cold Sore Superstars" was used in the song "No One Knows". 
"Polly Wants a Crack Rock" is a precursor to the Eagles of Death Metal song "I Only Want You".
In the song "Winners" the names were those of real Indio High School students who were winners of the Fifth Annual Coachella Valley Science Fair in the 1960s.  Many of these students were from the Class of 1965.
The tracks "Ending" and "Piano Bench Breaks" were not present the vinyl versions. "Piano Bench Breaks" features a hidden track which advertises upcoming releases.

Personnel
Joshua Homme: Vocals, piano, drums, marxophone, bass, backing vocals, gong, guitar, clap, harmony vocals, production
Samantha Maloney: Vocals, drums, bass, cymbals, slide bass
Brendon McNichol: Mandolin, drum, percussion, bass, guitar, tambora, balalaika
Chris Goss: Vocals, bass, guitar, clap
Fred Drake: Drums, Crumar, backing vocals, marxophone, harmony vocals, everything
Mark Lanegan: Vocals
Alain Johannes: Guitars, harmony vocals, Tuvan drone, clavinet, backing vocals, saxophone, udu, harmonium, cig fiddle, vocals, mixing
Nick ElDorado: Vocals, tension
Natasha Shneider: Vocals, foreign vocals, bass keys, Rhodes, stuff
Tony Mason: Engineering

References

08A
2001 compilation albums
Southern Lord Records compilation albums